Megachile affinis is a species of bee in the family Megachilidae. It was described by Brullé in 1832.

References

Affinis
Insects described in 1832